Paul Hans Eberhard (30 October 1917 – 4 September 1983) was a Swiss bobsledder who competed in the late 1940s. He won the silver medal in the two-man event at the 1948 Winter Olympics in St. Moritz. He was born in Bülach and died in Küsnacht.

References
Bobsleigh two-man Olympic medalists 1932-56 and since 1964 
DatabaseOlympics.com profile
Paul Eberhard's profile at Sports Reference.com

External links
 

1917 births
1983 deaths
Bobsledders at the 1948 Winter Olympics
Swiss male bobsledders
Olympic medalists in bobsleigh
Medalists at the 1948 Winter Olympics
Olympic silver medalists for Switzerland
20th-century Swiss people